The voiced upper-pharyngeal plosive or stop is a rare consonant.

Pharyngeal consonants are typically pronounced at two regions of the pharynx, upper and lower. The lower region is epiglottal, so the upper region is often abbreviated as merely 'pharyngeal'. Among widespread speech sounds in the world's languages, the upper pharynx produces a voiceless fricative  and a voiced sound that ranges from fricative to (more commonly) approximant, . Because the latter are most often trilled and rarely simply fricative, these consonants have been classified together as simply pharyngeal, and distinguished as plosive, fricative/approximant and trill.

No language is known to have a phonemic upper pharyngeal plosive. The Nǁng language (Nǀuu) is claimed to have an upper pharyngeal place of articulation among its stops. Click consonants in Nǁng have a rear closure that is said to vary between uvular or upper pharyngeal, depending on the click type. However, if the place were truly pharyngeal, they could not occur as nasal clicks, which they do.

Otherwise upper pharyngeal plosives are only known from disordered speech. The extIPA provides the letter  (a turned small-capital ), equivalent to IPA , to transcribe such a voiced upper pharyngeal plosive.

Features 
Features of the voiced upper-pharyngeal stop:

References

Pharyngeal consonants
Plosives
Voiced oral consonants